Liardet may refer to:

Claude Liardet, Major General in the British Army
Frances Liardet, writer and translator of Arabic literature
Henry Maughan Liardet, Major General in the British Army, son of Claude Liardet
Tim Liardet, English poet and critic
Wilbraham Liardet, Australian hotelier, water-colour artist and historian